Mark Dismore (born October 12, 1956 in Greenfield, Indiana) is a former driver in the Indy Racing League and the 1990 Toyota Pacific champion as well as the winner of the 1993 24 Hours of Daytona with Dan Gurney's All American Racers in a Toyota GTP car with co-drivers Rocky Moran and P. J. Jones. He made 3 CART starts in 1991 but was badly injured in a practice crash for the Indianapolis 500, when his car veered sharply towards the entrance of pit road at the exit of Turn 4 and back-ended the fence, only to careen across the pit lane and smash virtually head on at sizeable speed against the edge of pit wall; this second impact tore off the front of the car leaving Mark's legs exposed. Amongst the injuries he suffered, the most severe was a broken neck. He was largely out of open wheel racing until the 1996 Indy 500 where he drove for Team Menard though he did try to qualify in the 1992 Indianapolis 500 for Concept Motorsports in an outdated Lola/Buick. In 1997 he drove a second car at the Indy 500 for Kelley Racing and would become a full-time fixture there until the 2001 season. He returned to Menard for a partial season in 2002. Dismore has a single IRL win coming in the fall 1999 Texas Motor Speedway race and also finished a career-best third in points that season. Among his 62 career IRL starts he won four poles. He also represented the IRL in the International Race of Champions in 2000 and 2001.

He now owns and operates New Castle Motorsports Park, a Karting facility in New Castle, Indiana, he is also vice president of  Comet Kart Sales in Greenfield, Indiana the business was founded by his father and has been in family ownership ever since. New Castle Motorsports Park is the home of the Dan Wheldon Memorial Pro-Am Karting Challenge. The Wheldon Memorial Pro-Am Karting Challenge is a tribute and Fundraising event that is popular with racers, crews, sponsors and fans of IndyCar racing. The event returned in May 2019 after a nearly four year hiatus.

Motorsports career results

American Open-Wheel racing results
(key) (Races in bold indicate pole position) (Races in italics indicate fastest lap)

PPG IndyCar World Series

Indy Lights

Indy Racing League

Indianapolis 500

International Race of Champions
(key) (Bold – Pole position. * – Most laps led.)

24 Hours of Le Mans results

References

External links
 

1956 births
Living people
American racing drivers
Champ Car drivers
IndyCar Series drivers
Indianapolis 500 drivers
Indy Lights drivers
Atlantic Championship drivers
International Race of Champions drivers
24 Hours of Daytona drivers
24 Hours of Le Mans drivers
American Le Mans Series drivers
American Speed Association drivers
People from Greenfield, Indiana
Racing drivers from Indiana
International Kart Federation drivers
Arrow McLaren SP drivers
PDM Racing drivers